Dr. Walter Gross (written Groß in German) (21 October 1904 in Kassel – 25 April 1945 in Berlin) was a German physician appointed to create the Office for Enlightenment on Population Policy and Racial Welfare (Aufklärungsamt für Bevölkerungspolitik und Rassenpflege) for the Nazi party (NSDAP). He headed this office, renamed the Office of Racial Policy (Rassenpolitisches Amt) in 1934, until his suicide at the close of World War II.

Career 
Walter Gross was born in Kassel. In 1925, while training as a physician, he became a member of the NSDAP. He was appointed leader of the National Socialist German Doctors' Alliance in 1932. Gross was an anti-Semite and called for the extermination of the Jews and believed in the Final Solution that was so central to the Nazi Party.  He wrote several books on the subject of the "Jewish Question".  In many respects, he implemented the views of Alfred Rosenberg.

In 1933, Gross was appointed to create the National Socialist Office for Enlightenment on Population Policy and Racial Welfare, which was designed to educate the public and build support for the Nazi sterilization program and other "ethnic improvement" schemes through the 1930s.  This was termed "enlightenment" rather than "propaganda" by Nazi authorities, because it was not a call for immediate action but a long-term change in attitude, aiming at undermining the view where people thought of themselves as individuals rather than single links in the great chain of life. In its first year, it published fourteen pamphlets for racial education.   In 1933, he founded a mass-market glossy magazine, Neues Volk, which achieved wide popularity.  At the beginning of the war, his pamphlet You and Your Volk urged the soldiers to think racially.

Gross burned his files in Berlin at the closing of World War II, thereby, in the opinion of Claudia Koonz, erasing significant evidence "that would have incriminated the more than 3,000 members of his national network of racial educators."

Gross died in combat operations against the Red Army, which had already penetrated the Berlin city area, on 25 April 1945, in his private residence in Berlin-Schlachtensee. His colleagues would later describe this action as him 'seeking death', essentially committing suicide.

Writings
In 1938 Gross, then head of the Reich Bureau for Enlightenment on Population Policy and Racial Welfare, contributed a chapter entitled "National Socialist Racial Thought" to an English language book, Germany Speaks, prefaced by Joachim von Ribbentrop, Hitler’s newly appointed Foreign Minister.  The book endeavored to put an acceptable face on the activities of Nazi Germany.  Gross justified the sterilization program by arguing that "unrestrained propagation among the hereditarily unfit, the mentally deficient, imbeciles and hereditary criminals, etc.," had led to a birth rate nine times greater than that of the "fitter inhabitants".  He claimed that the Sterilization Law was passed "to prevent the transmission of hereditary disease". He described how an application lodged with the Court of Heredity would lead to an inquiry and judgment as to whether sterilization was required. He justified this as follows:

He addressed the Nazi policy of achieving racial purity in Germany, arguing its need based on the loss of the racially purest Germans in the previous war, and pointed to immigration policies of the United States and European countries have racially discriminatory bases, and noted that Asian nations have a long tradition of avoiding "a mingling of the blood".  Turning then to the Jews, he argued that Jews could not be tolerated, first as an alien race, second, as having too much financial power in Germany, and third, by associating them with Communism.  For these reasons, he says that the Nuremberg Laws were passed to exclude Jews from citizenship in the Reich.  By these laws, Jews and Germans were forbidden to intermarry, and "making illicit intercourse liable to punishment was designed primarily with a view to preventing the birth of further individuals of mixed blood whose fate is a sorry one everywhere in the world, because they are neither one thing nor the other."

References
Claudia Koonz, The Nazi Conscience, (Cambridge: Harvard University Press, 2003)

External links
Walter Gross at the Spartacus Educational website
 National Socialist Racial Policy: A Speech to German Women
 Race, A Radio Speech by Dr. Groß
 Blood is Holy, A Radio Speech by Dr. Groß
 

1904 births
1945 suicides
Nazi Party officials
Nazis who committed suicide in Germany
Holocaust perpetrators
Members of the Reichstag of Nazi Germany
Physicians from Kassel